Aalen Hauptbahnhof is a junction on the Rems Railway from Stuttgart, the Brenz Railway from Ulm, the Upper Jagst Railway to Crailsheim and Ries Railway to Donauwörth. The station is located 200 metres northeast of the historic old town (Altstadt) of Aalen in the German state of Baden-Württemberg. It is classified by Deutsche Bahn as a category 3 station. Aalen station was renamed a Hauptbahnhof (main station) at the timetable change on 11 December 2016.

History 

Despite disagreements between the countries of Württemberg and Bavaria, which did not have a common concept of a cross-border railway, the Rems Railway was opened by the Royal Württemberg State Railways on 18 July 1861. Aalen was not planned as a railway junction and the station at first was small with eight railway employees who also had postal duties. An extension of the railway towards Nördlingen—now considered part of the Ries Railway (Riesbahn)—opened on 3 October 1863. The third connection was achieved on 13 September 1864 with the opening of the Brenz Railway (Brenzbahn) to Heidenheim (the connection from Heidenheim to Ulm was not completed until 1876 because of the so-called Brenzbahn clause of the treaty between Württemberg and Bavaria that authorised construction of the Rems Railway). The Upper Jagst Railway (Oberen Jagstbahn) to Crailsheim was opened on 15 November 1866 and it was connected to Schwäbisch Hall on 10 December 1867 with the extension of the Hohenlohe Railway (Hohenlohebahn). In 1865, a railway repair shop was established in Aalen, which was later the basis for the train depot.

By that time it was becoming apparent that the station was too small for the increasing railway traffic. Its only covered platform was the "main platform" in front of the station building and its second platform was only about 1.8 m wide. Thus the expansion and renovation of the station began in 1873. In 1876 the new main station building was inaugurated. In 1884 the station had four tracks, three of which were used for passenger services. Thus, despite the scarcity of funds (the Württemberg government provided only 500,000 German gold marks of the necessary 3,500,000), the station was prepared for further traffic increases. By the end of the century, traffic grew to a total of 80 trains per day.

In 1901 funds were exhausted, but the state made available an additional 1.4 million gold marks. This allowed the station to be expanded from three to five tracks for passengers. On 31 October of that year the Härtsfeld Railway (Härtsfeldbahn), a 1000-mm narrow-gauge railway to Neresheim and Dillingen, was opened. Its tracks ended opposite the railway station on the other side of the tracks. In order to connect to the station, a 72 m long tunnel was built under the railway tracks. Since the line at first ran parallel with the line to Ulm, this section had a three-rail track.

In 1905, an electro-mechanical interlocking was installed at the station.

During World War II there was a wave of attacks on the station, starting on 1 and 2 April 1945, when it was not very damaged. Only the targeted attacks on 8 and 17 April did lasting damage to the station, causing passenger services to be stopped altogether. Traffic was resumed on 9 July at the request of the Allies.

The next major change took place in 1970 with the beginning of the electrification of the Rems Railway, which was completed on 28 May 1972. Electrification of the section to Crailsheim was completed on 2 June 1985.

The Härtsfeld Railway was closed for passenger services on 30 September 1972. Freight traffic closed two months later on 30 November. This was followed by the dismantling of the railway tracks.

A renovation of the main building, which had been planned in 1980, was deferred to 1990. The reason given was that the building was now under a preservation order. The 4.4 million Deutsche Marks project provided the station with a travel centre, a shop and a bistro.

In January 2010, it was announced that Aalen station would benefit from federal funds from the first economic stimulus package, totalling about €4.8 million, for modernisation and for adapting its access for the disabled. So three lifts are to be installed to connect the platforms and the underpass and the station platform are being raised from 38 to 55 centimetres high. Similarly the station as a whole is also being "rebuilt with modern equipment." Construction work began on 25 February 2011.

Operations 

The basic interval timetable of Baden-Württemberg operates at the station. Each hour at about 30 minutes after the hour regional services interchange at the station on the following routes in both directions:
Stuttgart–Aalen (Rems Railway)
Ulm–Aalen–Ellwangen (–Crailsheim, Brenz Railway and Upper Jagst Railway)
Aalen–Donauwörth (Ries Railway)

The interchange between services to and from Ellwangen and Donauwörth is at the nearby Goldshöfe station.

On every odd hour, interchange is possible between Intercity trains on the Karlsruhe–Stuttgart–Nürnberg route in both directions and Interregio-Express trains to and from Ulm.

In the south of the city is the Industriebahn Aalen (Aalen industrial railway), an industrial line run by the city, over which some 250 wagon loads are hauled each year.

Long distance

Regional services

Connections
Outside station is the main bus station, opened in 2006, and a park-and-ride car park. At the bus station is the information centre of the Verkehrsgemeinschaft Aalen (Aalen Transport Corporation). In 2003 a bike parking area with 204 places was opened, which is under video surveillance for protection from theft.

Other stations in Aalen 
The other stations in Aalen are Wasseralfingen, Unterkochen and Hofen. Goldshöfe station is partly in the town of Aalen and partly in the municipality of Rainau.

Notes

External links 

Railway stations in Baden-Württemberg
Railway stations in Germany opened in 1861
Buildings and structures in Ostalbkreis